Gosaukammerella is a genus of strophomenid brachiopods, with one species Gosaukammerella eomesozoica. It was originally thought to be a problematic calcareous alga, and described under the name Pycnoporidium eomesozoicum.

References

Prehistoric brachiopod genera
Productida